Lansing is a census-designated place and unincorporated community in Lansing Township, Mower County, Minnesota, United States. Its population was 181 as of the 2010 census.

Lansing was platted in 1858, and named after Lansing, Michigan. A post office has been in operation at Lansing since 1857.

References

Census-designated places in Mower County, Minnesota
Census-designated places in Minnesota
Former municipalities in Minnesota
1857 establishments in Minnesota Territory
Populated places established in 1857